The Students' Federation was a student movement in French India, founded by the Communist Party of French India on 6 March 1947. The launching of the Students' Federation came some months after the French India Students Congress had been formed. The Students' Federation took part in the pro-Independence protest in August 1947.

References

Student wings of communist parties
Student wings of political parties in French India
1947 establishments in French India
Student organizations established in 1947